Woodbury Kane (February 8, 1859 – December 5, 1905) was a noted yachtsman and bon vivant, and member of Theodore Roosevelt's Rough Riders. A director of the Metropolitan Register Company, Kane served aboard the Columbia in the 1899 America's Cup race. He also was a noted hunter of big game, both in North America and South Africa.

He was a member of the New York Yacht Club (for many years serving on the club's America's Cup committee), the Metropolitan Club, the Knickerbocker Club, the Racquet Court Club, the Seawanhaka Corinthian Yacht Club, the Meadowbrook Hunt Club, the Hudson River Ice Yacht Club, the Larchmont Club, and the Yacht and Country Club.

Early life
Kane was born on February 8, 1859, in Newport, Rhode Island.  He was one of eight children born to Oliver Delancey Kane (1816–1874) and his wife Louisa (née Langdon) Kane (1821–1894).  Among his siblings were brothers were Colonel Delancey Astor Kane, and John Innes Kane, and S. Nicholson Kane.  His sisters were Louisa Dorothea Kane, Emily Astor (née Kane) Jay, and Sybil Kent Kane.  He was a cousin of Lt. Col. John Jacob Astor IV.

Woodbury entered Harvard College in the autumn of 1878; during university he was  a member of the Hasty Pudding and Porcellian Clubs and other organizations. While at Harvard he became a close friend of Theodore Roosevelt. At Harvard, he played football and was considered an expert at cricket, tennis, and polo. He had a most charming personality, and his well-bred manner, his elegance of carriage and movement, his lithe and erect figure, and the zest with which he entered into tennis, football, boxing, and running races, together with his courtesy and good humor, made him conspicuous among his classmates.

After graduation he lived the easy life of a gentleman in New York and Newport.

Spanish–American War service

When the Spanish–American War broke out in late April 1898, Kane enlisted in the First United States Volunteer Cavalry, better known as the "Rough Riders." Kane and several of his East Coast friends, including William Tiffany, donated two Colt Machine Guns that cost $7,500 each.

When the Rough Riders were allowed to expand from their original number of 778 to 1000, Kane was commissioned a lieutenant. Kane was remarkable for always being immaculately dressed even during the worst conditions. Roosevelt mentioned him in his account The Rough Riders:

On July 1, 1898, in the assault on San Juan Hill by the Rough Riders, and while leading K Troop, Kane was wounded in the forearm and arm by Mauser rifle fire. For his wounds, he was awarded a citation for gallantry and was promoted to captain in the volunteer service. He served with distinction throughout the Cuban campaign. Kane is one of the Rough Riders featured in the foreground of Frederic Remington's famous painting of the charge on San Juan Hill.

Regular Army officer, San Juan Battle Gatling Gun Commander batter commander and renowned developer of their forward tactical use, John H. Parker, described Captain Woodbury Kane in his book, as follows:

Post-war life and marriage
Upon returning to the United States, Captain Kane became a veteran companion of the New York Commandery of the Military Order of Foreign Wars.  Returning to New York City after his war service, Kane lived at 23 West 47th Street.  On March 28, 1905, Kane was married Sallie Hargous Elliot, the divorced former wife of Duncan Elliott, in Aiken, South Carolina.

Hunting Club historian, Judith Tabler wrote in her book on a Fox Hunt club to which Kane and fellow rough riders William Tiffany were members:

Kane died on December 5, 1905, at his apartment at the Algonquin Hotel in New York City from paralysis of the heart after returning from duck hunting in South Carolina, after contracting a cold.  Kane's funeral service was held at the Church of the Ascension at 10:00 am on December 8, 1905. He is buried at the Kane family plot at Newport, Rhode Island.

Captain Woodbury left behind no children, but he did have his favorite polo pony, Punch.  Punch had been retired to a park near Hyde Park, New York, where Woodbury had frequently visited him.  Punch died May 22, 1910, at the record-breaking age of forty-five. The death was noted on the front page of The New York Times, and many attended Punch's burial on A.T. Jones' farm.

References

1859 births
1905 deaths
America's Cup sailors
Members of the New York Yacht Club
Burials in Rhode Island
Hasty Pudding alumni
People from Aiken, South Carolina
Kane family
People from Newport, Rhode Island
Social leaders